Malvina was a privateer brig from Nantes commissioned circa 1807. The Royal Navy captured her in 1808.

On 28 January 1808 Malvina, of Nantes, captured the Danish ship Margaretta, and took her into Nantes. Margaretta had been sailing from Gibraltar to London with a cargo of potash.

On 15 February 1808  captured near Barbados at  the French privateer brig Malvina. Malvina was commanded by René Salaun. She had been travelling with her prize, the British ship Juliana, which Guerriere recaptured. Guerriere sailed on to Barbados but sent Malvina and Juliana back to England. Malvina had been on her way to Guadeloupe.

Citations

References
 
1800s ships
Privateer ships of France
Captured ships